Kathy or Kathie Sullivan is the name of:

 Kathy Sullivan (Australian politician) (born 1942), Kathryn Sullivan, former Australian politician
 Kathy Sullivan (American politician) (born 1954), Kathleen Sullivan, former Chairwoman of the Democratic Party in New Hampshire
 Kathy Sullivan (EastEnders), fictional character better known as Kathy Beale
 Kathie Sullivan (born 1953), American gospel singer and performer on the Lawrence Welk Show
 Kathryn D. Sullivan (born 1951), also called "Kathy", American geologist and former NASA astronaut

See also
Kathleen Sullivan (disambiguation)
Kathryn Sullivan (disambiguation)
Catherine Sullivan (disambiguation)
 Kate Sullivan (disambiguation)
 Katy Sullivan, American paralympian